Tamahú is a municipality in the Guatemalan department of Alta Verapaz.

History
Tamahú was established on 7 December 1574 by friars Francisco de Viana, Lucas Gallego and Fray Guillermo.

One of the most powerful German families that settled in the region by the end of the 19th century was the Thomae family, who had their headquarters in neighbor Purulhá.  Mauricio Thomae's early farmland were the following haciendas:

Years later, during general Jorge Ubico's presidency (1931-1944), Thomae went on to become one of the most influential landlords in the German Verapaz, along with the Sarg, Sapper and Diesseldorf families.  Ubico had been governor of Cobán during Manuel Estrada Cabrera 22-year regime and befriended several German families, including the Thomaes.

Climate

Tamahú has a tropical rainforest climate (Köppen: Af).

Geographic location

Tamahú is practically surrounded by Alta Verapaz Department municipalities:

References

External links
 Tamahú (in Spanish)

Municipalities of the Alta Verapaz Department